Battle of Nowa Wieś may also refer to:

 Battle of Nowa Wieś (1831)
 First Battle of Nowa Wieś (1863)
 Second Battle of Nowa Wieś (1863)